Dhaifan is a sub-district located in Raydah District, 'Amran Governorate, Yemen. Dhaifan had a population of 16896 according to the 2004 census.

References 

Sub-districts in Raydah District